Surya Kumar Bhagvandas (born 1957) is an Indian actor in the Telugu film industry portraying characters in supporting roles.

Surya started his film career as an actor with the 1986 Telugu movie Vikram. He has been awarded four Nandi awards in his acting career spanning thirty-five years, two for TV performances as best villain (Preminchu, Premalo Jeevinchu) and best supporting actor (Janani Janmabhoomi) and two for film performances in films Sindhooram and Show. In G. Neelakanta Reddy's Show, he played the male lead opposite Manjula. This performance brought him a special jury Nandi award in 2001. Surya has acted in more than 600 films and television episodes till date.

Early life
Surya's father Lieutenant Colonel R. D. Bhagvandas and mother Prabhavathi Bhagvandas and the family moved to Hyderabad and started a school called 'Trinity Public School'. He was a teacher for 28 years and for several years his teaching and acting jobs ran concurrently. He joined the second batch of Students from Madhu Film Acting School (1984) after completing Bachelor of Arts in English literature and Bachelor Of Education and was awarded the gold medal for most outstanding student.

Awards
Nandi Awards
 Best Supporting Actor - Sindhooram (1997)
 Special Jury Award -  Show (2001)

Filmography
Actor

Dubbing artist

Honorary initiatives
Surya has also been contributing his dramatic skills to the annual Passion Play and Nativity play during Good Friday and Christmas at the Pentecostal New Life Assembly of God Church, Secunderabad.  In addition, Surya  also witnesses about Christianity much like some of his colleagues in the Telugu cinema, Jayasudha, Nagma, Raja Abel or for that matter in the Tamil cinema, Mohini, Prabhu Solomon and others at spiritual meetings conducted not only by the established Churches but the small and indigenous Churches as well.

References

External links
 

Telugu comedians
Telugu male actors
Living people
1957 births
Indian Christians
Marathi people
Indian male comedians
Converts to Christianity